Nematopus may refer to:
 Nematopus (bug), a genus of bugs in the family Coreidae
 Nematopus, a genus of flies in the family Dolichopodidae, synonym of Filatopus
 Nematopus, a genus of crustaceans in the family Mysidae, synonym of Erythrops